Vespertilionoidea is a superfamily of bats containing five families: Cistugidae, Miniopteridae, Molossidae, Natalidae, and Vespertilionidae. It is one of three superfamilies in the suborder Yangochiroptera, the others being Noctilionoidea and Emballonuroidea.

References

Bat taxonomy
Taxa named by John Edward Gray
Mammal superfamilies